The April 2022 North American storm complex affected much of the Rocky Mountains and the Midwestern United States with tornadoes, heavy snow, and gusty winds. The system in general first began impacting the Northwest on April 11, before moving eastward into the Rocky Mountains the following day. It was also responsible for producing a large severe weather outbreak of tornadoes and damaging straight-line wind in the Midwest and South while contributing to a powerful blizzard in the upper Midwest states of North and South Dakota.

The warm side of the system also knocked power out to thousands in the South and produced 74 tornadoes, with the strongest being rated EF3, and very large hail as well. One non-tornadic death was attributed to the severe weather in the South, while another non-tornadic death occurred in North Dakota when a blizzard hit the area.

Meteorological synopsis

Signs for a severe weather outbreak became evident the day before, on April 10. The Storm Prediction Center, on their Day 2 Convective Outlook, introduced a large slight risk area, covering northeastern Texas, southeastern Oklahoma, much of Arkansas, southern portions of Missouri, and extreme western Kentucky and Tennessee. This, combined with the expected daytime heating to occur over much of the Ark-La-Tex region, created an environment favorable for supercell initiation. Given this, the outlook introduced a large 5% contour for tornadoes. The following day, the risk was increased to an enhanced level, with this new area of higher probabilites for severe weather being placed along north-central Arkansas and extreme eastern Oklahoma. Given the presence of strong wind shear and CAPE values reaching 2500 J/kg in this area, a 10%, unhatched corridor for tornadoes was introduced, as the environment was poised to be more favorable for supercells to develop. As the afternoon advanced, even greater confidence grew that this corridor was even more favorable for sustained supercells, and a 10%, hatched risk for tornadoes, indicating the possibilities for strong tornadoes to occur, was issued along the same corridor in Arkansas and eastern Oklahoma. Multiple supercell thunderstorms developed by the early evening, soon becoming tornadic. A couple of intense supercells produced a few tornadoes over west-central Arkansas. This included a large supercell that developed near Mayflower, Arkansas, producing a tornado that prompted the issuance of a tornado emergency. However, the tornado ended up only causing EF1 tree damage. Several other EF1 tornadoes touched down in the area that afternoon and evening as well, one of which caused considerable damage to trees, mobile homes, and outbuildings near Scranton.

On the morning of April 12, the Storm Prediction Center issued a moderate risk for Iowa, including a 15% hatched risk for tornadoes. A highly sheared and unstable airmass was in place over Iowa, with CAPE values exceeding 2000 J/kg, ample low-level moisture, and significant low-level shear and helicity present. With supercell development being likely, strong tornadoes were expected. Farther south, an enhanced risk was in place over eastern Texas, with a 5% risk of tornadoes outlined for that area, along with much of Louisiana and Arkansas. Later that day, a large and strong EF2 tornado caused major damage to homes near Gilmore City, Iowa, and destroyed multiple barns and farm implements, injuring one person. Another EF2 tornado caused significant damage to a few structures near Rutland, while an EF1 tornado moved through the outskirts of Mason City, damaging some buildings there as well. In the southern threat area, a large high-end EF3 tornado destroyed multiple homes and two churches near the town of Salado, Texas, injuring 23 people. Farther north, a damaging EF2 tornado struck the town of Taopi, Minnesota, where homes had roofs and exterior walls torn off, many trees were downed, cars were flipped, and two people were injured. On April 13, the Storm Prediction Center issued another moderate risk, this time for eastern Arkansas, northern Mississippi, western Tennessee, the Missouri Bootheel, and Western Kentucky, including a 15% hatched risk area for tornadoes and a 45% hatched risk area for damaging winds. Another highly moist, unstable, and sheared environment was in place, and numerous additional tornadoes touched down across the threat area, though due to a predominantly linear storm mode, only a couple of strong tornadoes occurred, although there was widespread significant wind damage. The most significant tornado of the day impacted the rural community of Clarkdale, Mississippi, causing EF2 damage to trees and structures. Another EF2 tornado caused major tree damage near Sikes, Louisiana. Father north, several weak EF0 and EF1 tornadoes caused minor to moderate damage near the towns of Monette, Arkansas; Leachville, Arkansas; Mayfield, Kentucky; and Briensburg, Kentucky, all of which sustained severe to catastrophic damage on December 10, 2021.

Confirmed tornadoes

April 11 event

April 12 event

April 13 event

Bell County–Salado, Texas

This large, intense tornado first touched down north of Florence in Williamson County, Texas, just east of SH 195 and moved east-northeastward, initially only causing weak EF0 damage. As the tornado crossed Ramms Drive, it intensified to EF1 strength, damaging a manufactured home and causing significant tree damage, with several large mature oak trees being uprooted. It weakened back to EF0 strength as it crossed County Road 228 and moved over rural terrain towards the Williamson–Bell County line. It briefly reintensified to EF1 strength as it moved east-southeast before crossing the county line at County Road 231. A mobile home was shifted off its foundation and multiple large oak trees were snapped and uprooted. It weakened slightly as it entered Bell County, damaging an outbuilding and producing tree damage as it turned back to the east-northeast, approaching FM 2843 with the damage in this area being rated from EF0 to EF1. Evidence shows that the parent circulation produced at least three small, brief tornadoes as it moved into Bell County that moved along short paths before the larger tornado formed. Due to all of them occurring from the same circulation and because each were on the ground within a short amount of time of each other, they were considered as part of the same tornado that originally touched down and the damage path reached its peak width in this area as a result.

As it began to move along FM 2843, the tornado rapidly intensified to EF2 strength as it passed near a stone quarry, severely damaging a frame home, destroying a manufactured home, and inflicting lesser damage to another manufactured home. As the tornado passed through the intersection of FM 2843 and Cedar Valley Road, it reached high-end EF3 intensity and continued to follow FM 2843 to the east-northeast. Around 10 to 15 homes were severely damaged or destroyed in this area, with the most severe damage occurring along Buttermilk Lane, where a few well-built homes were mostly leveled, with only portions of a few walls left standing. Trees in this area were snapped, denuded, and debarked, and multiple power poles were snapped. Vehicles were thrown, impaled with projectiles, or piled on top of each other, and two churches in this area were also destroyed, one of which was mostly leveled and swept away. After moving away from FM 2843 west of Salado, the tornado weakened back to EF2 intensity, causing significant tree damage and destroying some outbuildings. Just before it reached Mustang Creek Road, it abruptly made a sharp 90-degree turn and began moving due-north, weakening to EF1 strength and producing a broad swath of tree damage, including several trees that were uprooted. Some homes and barns also sustained EF1 damage along this portion of the path. The tornado continued at EF1 intensity as it then crossed Crows Ranch Road, tearing metal panels off the roof of a home and blowing in a panel garage door. It then crossed over a ridge and briefly intensified back to high-end EF2 strength as it moved over FM 2484. A home suffered significant roof and exterior wall loss at this location, a large barn was shifted off its foundation, a shed had its roof panels lifted up, and many trees were uprooted. The tornado then weakened back to EF1 intensity as it continued due-north, causing minor to moderate damage in the South Shore subdivision and Union Grove Park before lifting as it moved over Stillhouse Hollow Lake. Twenty-three people were injured, and a pregnant woman lost her unborn baby as a result of injuries sustained during the tornado.

Non-tornadic effects

Severe storms
Very large hail fell in central and eastern Texas on the afternoon of April 12. An area of strong straight-line winds also impacted Downtown Shreveport, Louisiana, downing many trees and power lines. Later that night in Louisiana, a large swath of damaging straight-line winds of up to  moved northeastward from northwest of Corinth through Bernice. Many trees were damaged with some snapped or uprooted and a building in Bernice lost part of its roof covering. Wind damage covered a massive area in Mississippi and the Ohio Valleys on April 13. Wind gusts in Peoria, Illinois reached  on April 14. In Rison, Arkansas, several trees were blown down, including one that fell on a mobile home, resulting in a fatality.

Winter weather side

Freezing temperatures
Several locations in Montana also had record low conditions across April 12 and 13. The maximum of  also broke a record. Record cold maximums were more common. April 2022 was the 3rd coldest on record in Washington and 5th coldest on record in Montana, while being the coldest in 16 cities including Walla Walla, Miles City and Kalispell.

Blizzard
Pony, Montana saw  of snow. The blizzard caused Interstate 94 to be shut down between Jamestown, North Dakota and Glendive, Montana, US Route 83 to be closed from Bismarck, North Dakota to Minot, North Dakota, and US Route 85 to be closed from the South Dakota border to Amidon, North Dakota. The snow significantly contributed to the snowiest April on record in Bismarck, North Dakota. The blizzard caused one fatality in North Dakota. In addition Portland, Oregon saw its first April accumulating snow on record, causing 55,000 customers to lose power. The snowstorm caused multiple car crashes along Interstate 82, and forced portions of U.S. Route 26 in Portland to close.

Impact
Forecasted blizzard conditions caused Amtrak to suspend its Empire Builder service between Spokane, Washington and St. Paul, Minnesota between April 11–13 and between April 16–18. The southbound Texas Eagle was severely delayed early on April 13 due to severe storms downing trees on the right-of-way south of Arkadelphia, Arkansas. Later that day, severe weather warnings and downed trees also delayed the northbound City of New Orleans. The westbound Cardinal incurred the most delays. It first struck a tree before coming into Maysville, Kentucky early on April 14 and then was delayed several more times due to more down trees along its path. Upon running over 8 hours late, the train was terminated at Indianapolis with alternate transportation provided along the rest of the route to Chicago.

On April 11, the Major League Baseball announced that the game between the Saint Louis Cardinals and Pittsburgh Pirates was postponed and rescheduled for June 14. On April 12, the National Hockey League announced that the upcoming Winnipeg Jets game against the Seattle Kraken, which was originally scheduled for April 13, has been postponed to May 1 as a winter storm sweeps through the southern area of Manitoba. On April 13, a video is released of cattle in Douglas huddling together in the storm to protect their calves.

See also 

 List of North American tornadoes and tornado outbreaks
 List of United States tornadoes in April 2022
 Tornado outbreak and blizzard of April 13–15, 2018
 Weather of 2022

Notes

References

External links
 LIVE 10pm 4/13/22 Severe Weather Update
 LIVE 12am 4/14/22 Weather Radar

Tornadoes of 2022
Tornado outbreaks
Tornadoes in Arkansas
Tornadoes in Alabama
Tornadoes in Indiana
Tornadoes in Iowa
Tornadoes in Kentucky
Tornadoes in Louisiana
Tornadoes in Minnesota
Tornadoes in Mississippi
Tornadoes in Nebraska
Tornadoes in Oklahoma
Tornadoes in Texas
2022 meteorology
F3 tornadoes